is a Japanese voice actress. She is affiliated with Aoni Production. Her roles included Natsumi Koshigaya in Non Non Biyori, Secre Swallowtail in Black Clover, Ochaco Uraraka in My Hero Academia, Tsubaki Sawabe in Your Lie in April, Iroha Isshiki in My Youth Romantic Comedy Is Wrong, As I Expected, Suzuka Dairenji in Tokyo Ravens, Nagato-class, Sendai-class, Kuma, Tama, Shimakaze in Kantai Collection, Cocoa Hoto in Is the Order a Rabbit?, Ran Mitake in BanG Dream!, Clarisse in Granblue Fantasy, Yotsuba Nakano in The Quintessential Quintuplets, Hasuki Komai in Boarding School Juliet, Nao Tomori in Charlotte, Rinne in Pretty Rhythm: Rainbow Live, King of Prism, Yae Sakura in Honkai Impact 3rd, Prinz Eugen in Azur Lane, Gabi Braun in Attack on Titan: The Final Season, Ephnel in SoulWorker and Yae Miko in Genshin Impact. She has performed theme, and character songs for each series. Sakura won the Best Supporting Actress award at the 12th Seiyu Awards.

Biography
Sakura was born on January 29, 1994, in Ebisu, Shibuya, Tokyo, Japan. She had a desire in becoming an actress and decided to enroll in a theater acting school, during her junior high school years. At school, she studied Japanese dancing, stretching, sword fighting, voice training and acting, although she initially continued to pursue acting, after performing on stage, she realized that she "was different" and decided that acting was no longer a suitable career for her. At this point, she decided to become a voice actress.

Sakura made her voice acting debut in 2010, starring in Keroro Gunso the Super Movie: Creation! Ultimate Keroro, Wonder Space-Time Island, and playing Futaba Shirayuki in the ninth episode of the anime series Ōkami-san & her Seven Companions, as well as voicing background characters in the anime series Oreimo. In 2011, she voiced Merry Nightmare, the heroine of the anime series Dream Eater Merry, as well as the character Yozora Mikazuki in the anime series Haganai during flashbacks. She also performed the song , which was used as the ending theme to Dream Eater Merry. In 2012, she voiced the character Miyabi Kannagi in Nakaimo - My Sister Is Among Them!, Marii Buratei in Joshiraku, and Ayami Ōruri in Pretty Rhythm: Dear My Future. She also performed the song "Heavenly Lover" together with the other cast members of Nakaimo, and the song " which she performed together with her Joshiraku co-stars; the song was used as the opening theme to Joshiraku.

In 2013, Sakura played Asuka Mishima in A Town Where You Live, Alisa Ayase in Love Live!, Yuiko Enomoto in Love Lab, Natsumi Koshigaya in Non Non Biyori, Akane Isshiki in Vividred Operation and Suzuka Dairenji in Tokyo Ravens. In 2014, she played the role of Cocoa Hoto in the anime series Is the Order a Rabbit?; she and her co-stars performed the series' opening theme "Daydream Cafe" as the group Petit Rabbit's. She also played Silvia Lautreamont in Dragonar Academy, Yuzuki Kurebayashi in Selector Infected WIXOSS, Levi Kazama in Trinity Seven and Tsubaki Sawabe in Your Lie in April. In 2015, Sakura reprised the role for the second season of Is the Order a Rabbit?; she and her co-stars performed the series' opening theme "No-Poi!". She voiced Nao Tomori in Charlotte, Iroha Isshiki in My Youth Romantic Comedy Is Wrong, As I Expected, Haru Onodera in Nisekoi, and Moa in Show by Rock!!. In 2016, Sakura played Ochaco Uraraka in My Hero Academia, Rena Asteria in Regalia: The Three Sacred Stars and Ryoka Narusawa in Occultic;Nine. In 2017, she played the roles of Hikari Tsuneki in Seiren, Phoena in Chain Chronicle, and Shizuku Hanaoka in Welcome to the Ballroom. Sakura shared the Best Supporting Actress Award at the 12th Seiyu Awards with Saori Ōnishi. In 2018, she played the roles of Yū Ōsawa in Ms. Koizumi Loves Ramen Noodles and Saiko Yonebayashi in Tokyo Ghoul:re. In 2019, she played Yotsuba Nakano in The Quintessential Quintuplets.

On January 31, 2022, Sakura announced that she has left her talent agency I'm Enterprise. The following day, Aoni Production announced that she has joined their agency.

Filmography

Television animation

Original net animation

Original video animation

Theatrical animation

Video games

Dubbing

Live-action
The Girl with All the Gifts, Melanie (Sennia Nanua)
School of Rock, Tomika (Breanna Yde)
The Time Traveler's Wife, Charisse (Natasha Lopez)

Animation
 Ballerina, Dora
 The Cuphead Show!, Ms. Chalice
 Sing 2, Piglet Adeline
 White Snake, Xiao Qing
 Gabby's Dollhouse, Kitty Fairy (Tara Strong)

Discography

References

External links

 Official agency profile 
 
 

1994 births
Living people
Aoni Production voice actors
Japanese video game actresses
Japanese voice actresses
Seiyu Award winners
Voice actresses from Tokyo
21st-century Japanese actresses